The Student Boarder (하숙생 - Hasuksaeng) is a 1966 South Korean film. It was presented at the 27th Venice International Film Festival.

Synopsis
This melodrama is about a man whose girlfriend leaves him for another man after his face is disfigured. He has plastic surgery, then tracks down his old girlfriend to make her regret her past actions.

References

Bibliography

1966 films
1960s Korean-language films
South Korean drama films
Films directed by Jung Jin-woo